Malsaram is a 1975 Indian Malayalam film, directed by K. Narayanan. The film stars Raghavan, Mancheri Chandran, M. G. Soman and Rani Chandra in the lead roles. The film has musical score by M. K. Arjunan.

Cast
 
Raghavan 
Mancheri Chandran
M. G. Soman 
Rani Chandra 
Sakunthala
Sujatha 
Vijayaraghavan 
Vincent

Soundtrack
The music was composed by M. K. Arjunan. All lyrics written by P. Bhaskaran

References

External links
 

1975 films
1970s Malayalam-language films